River Country may refer to:

 Disney's River Country, a defunct water park
 KWFI-FM, a radio station that aired a country music format under this name from 2011 to 2018